Ste. It was established in 2015 under the Manitoba Ecological Reserves Act.

See also
 List of ecological reserves in Manitoba
 List of protected areas of Manitoba

References

External links
 Ste. Labre Bog Ecological Reserve, Backgrounder
 iNaturalist: Ste. Labre Bog Ecological Reserve

Protected areas established in 2015
Ecological reserves of Manitoba
Nature reserves in Manitoba
Protected areas of Manitoba